The Austin A70 Hampshire and later Austin A70 Hereford are cars that were produced by Austin of Britain from 1948 until 1954. They were conventional body-on-frame cars with similar styling to the smaller A40 Devon and A40 Somerset models respectively. 85,682 were built.

A70 Hampshire

Most first generation A70s were Hampshire 4-door saloons, though some estate and pickup truck versions were also produced as the A70 Countryman and A70 Pick-up respectively. The new car was nevertheless lighter and published acceleration and top speed figures were correspondingly brisker. The Hampshire used Girling hydraulic brakes which operated on the front wheels only; the rears being mechanical, a setup which was shared with the earlier (GS2) A40 Devon.

Production of the model ended in 1950 with 35,261 being built. In 1950 the UK price was £648, which included the heater.

A70 Hereford

The A70 Hereford replaced the Hampshire in 1950 and was wider and slightly longer with an extra  in the wheelbase. A new addition to the range was the A70 Coupe, a 2-door convertible with coachwork by Carbodies of Coventry. A notable mechanical change was the use of fully hydraulic brakes. The smaller A40 Somerset had similar styling and shared the same doors and rear wings.

The car retained the 2199cc 4-cylinder engine first seen officially in 1945 on the Austin 16.   Performance was adequate by the standards of the time, but the car was not particularly quiet, and an Autocar magazine road test in 1950 reported a "small vibration at about 40 m.p.h. on the overrun" on its test car.  Austin had given a lead after the war in equipping its cars with interior heaters at no extra cost, and the Hereford came fitted with "the latest Smiths fresh-air installation" as standard equipment.   The road tester found the heater, like the engine and indeed the windscreen wipers, "rather noisy in operation", however.

Sales were slow, with 50,421 having been produced when the A90 Westminster replaced it in 1954. Another rare variant was the A70 Pickup/Ute This shared the same platform as the estate, but with fully faired bodywork aft of the driving cab. The interior of this rather plush workhorse was the same as the saloon, but instead of a large split-bench seat the pickup had a full width bench seat. Full instrumentation was mounted in the centre of the dashboard allowing easy viewing whether for left- or right-hand drive versions .All variations had a 4 speed steering column gear change.

The test car cost £911 including taxes.

References

External links

 "A70 Hampshire/Hereford", Austin Memories
 "Owners' club", Austin Counties Car Club
 1953 Austin A70 "Pick-up" sales brochure, "Museum Victoria"

A70
Cars introduced in 1948
1950s cars
Sedans
Rear-wheel-drive vehicles
Coupés
Station wagons